Brian Sean Hurley (born 1963) is a United States Navy rear admiral who has served as the Director, Joint Service Provider of the Defense Information Systems Agency since June 5, 2019. Previously, he served as the Reserve Deputy Commander for Maritime Operations of the United States Fleet Forces Command. Raised in Galveston, Texas, Hurley earned a bachelor's degree from Texas A&M University in 1987. He transitioned to the Navy Reserve in 2000.

References

External links
 

1963 births
Living people
Place of birth missing (living people)
People from Galveston, Texas
Texas A&M University alumni
United States Navy reservists
Recipients of the Meritorious Service Medal (United States)
Recipients of the Legion of Merit
United States Navy admirals
Recipients of the Defense Superior Service Medal
Military personnel from Texas